Przybyszów  is a village in the administrative district of Gmina Sława, within Wschowa County, Lubusz Voivodeship, in western Poland.

During World War II, the Germans operated a women's subcamp of the Gross-Rosen concentration camp in the vicinity of the village.

References

Villages in Wschowa County